Orange High School is a traditional four-year public high school located in the city of Orange, California. Orange High is part of the Orange Unified School District and competes in the Golden West League.

History
Orange High School first opened on September 21, 1903 as Orange Union High School (using the Dobner Block on South Glassell as a temporary location). The first building for the new campus was completed in the summer of 1905 at Palm Ave. and Glassell St. in the city of Orange and first occupied in September of that year. Orange Union High was the county's fourth school.

In its first year, there were eighty one (81) students enrolled. In 1904, Helen Billingsley becomes the first graduate of Orange Union High School.

In 1953, Orange High School moved to its current location at 525 N. Shaffer St. (corner of N. Shaffer St. and Walnut Ave.) and its original location would eventually become the campus for Chapman University.

Orange High is the oldest high school in the Orange Unified School District and currently serves downtown Orange, and small portions of southern Anaheim, eastern Garden Grove and northern Santa Ana.

Sports
Orange Union High's Fred Kelly (1911) won gold in the 110 m high hurdles at the 1912 Olympics.

In 1929, Orange Union High School won the Southern California Minor League Football Championship.

Orange High School's gymnasium, also known as "The Dome", was dedicated to Howard (HOD) E. Chambers in 1955.

In 1971, the varsity football team won the Crestview League Title, coached by Vince Deveney. The team was led on offense by QB Mike Churchward, FB Tom Nation, HB Paul Sanford and RB Randy Branch. On defense they were led by DT Brian Fraser, DT Leonard Wagner, DT Lupe Uribe and LB Rick Swanson.

In May 2011, Orange High's varsity baseball field was selected by the Baseball Tomorrow Fund and Major League Baseball Groundskeepers organization to be renovated.  One high school in the United States is selected each year for this renovation depending on its proximity to the annual meeting of the groundskeeper group. The new field was unveiled on Tuesday, January 10, 2012.

Orange High's varsity football team, coached by Robert Pedroza, won the CIF Southern Section Division 13 Championship in 2017 for the first time in 88 years and would later fall short, 31-29, to Strathmore High School in the state championship game.

In 2017, Orange High's girls' tennis went undefeated (11–0) in league play, with an overall record of 23–2–1. That would be the last time Orange played on the original tennis courts. In 2018, the courts were upgraded, refinished, and dedicated by the Johnson family, long-time supporters of Orange High's tennis program.

In 2019, Orange High's athletic track and field (used by sports such as football, soccer, and track) were refinished and upgraded by the school district. Because of the construction projects going on that year, Orange High sports teams that utilized the athletic field spent a season competing at off-site venues. Later that year, the varsity football team won the Orange Coast League Championship, defeating Santa Ana, 57–13, during its homecoming game at Chapman University. The team would go on to win the next two CIF rounds over San Marino and JW North, before falling to Simi Valley in the third round.

Coming out of the COVID-19 pandemic in 2021, Orange High's Football team wins the Orange Coast League Championship, finishing the regular season with an overall record of 5-1.

In 2022, Orange High's Varsity Baseball team won the Orange Coast League Championship. They would finish the season with an overall record of 18-11-1, which included a first-round win in CIF. The Panthers would later fall short to the Burroughs (Burbank, CA) in a second-round loss, 7-2.

Orange High Football doubled up in 2022 as their varsity team (8-2) repeated as Orange Coast League Champs (2021, 2022) after defeating Santa Ana (7-3) at "The Bowl" (Santa Ana Stadium) in Santa Ana. The Freshmen team also took first place in league after a big win at home just a day earlier.

Notable alumni
*Chuck Baker, professional baseball player
Fred Kelly (1911), 1912 Olympic gold medalist in 110m high hurdles
Bill Holman, Grammy Award winning composer, arranger 
Micah Knorr, NFL punter
Mary Decker (1976), distance runner, 2-time world champion
Gaddi Vasquez, Peace Corps Director and US Ambassador
Danny Califf, professional soccer player
Dave Matranga, professional baseball player
Pamela Courson, Jim Morrison's girlfriend
Steve Johnson, professional tennis player, 2016 Olympic Medalist and 2-time NCAA singles champion
Lorrin "Whitey" Harrison (1913–1993), surfing pioneer

References

External links
Official school website

Educational institutions established in 1903
Education in Orange, California
High schools in Orange County, California
Public high schools in California
1903 establishments in California